Morgan Township is one of twelve townships in Harrison County, Indiana. As of the 2010 census, its population was 4,153 and it contained 1,735 housing units.

Geography

Cities and towns
 Palmyra

Unincorporated towns
 Bradford
 Central Barren
 Sennville
(This list is based on USGS data and may include former settlements.)

References

External links
 Indiana Township Association
 United Township Association of Indiana

Townships in Harrison County, Indiana
Townships in Indiana